Julani Archibald (born 18 May 1991) is a Kittitian footballer who plays as a goalkeeper for Maltese club Birkirkara and the Saint Kitts and Nevis national football team. Besides Saint Kitts and Nevis, he has played in Trinidad and Tobago, Honduras, and Malta.

Club career
In the 2015 MLS Caribbean Combine, Archibald was one of two goalkeepers in the 19-player list and was the one of two players from Saint Kitts and Nevis.

He made the winning save for W Connection F.C. to prevent domestic rivals Central F.C. in a dramatic penalty-shoot-out. As a result, W Connection made the final of the 2015 Trinidad and Tobago Classic.

In 2018, he signed for Real de Minas.

In 2021, he signed for Santa Lucia. In 2022, he signed for Birkirkara.

International career
Archibald was the Kittitian goalkeeper for the 2018 FIFA World Cup qualification stages against Turks and Caicos.

He also played in two friendlies, including a victory against the Andorra.

References

External links

1991 births
Living people
Association football goalkeepers
Saint Kitts and Nevis footballers
People from Basseterre
Saint Kitts and Nevis expatriate footballers
Expatriate footballers in Trinidad and Tobago
Saint Kitts and Nevis expatriate sportspeople in Trinidad and Tobago
Expatriate footballers in Honduras
Expatriate footballers in Malta
Village Superstars FC players
W Connection F.C. players
C.D. Real de Minas players
St. Lucia F.C. players
Liga Nacional de Fútbol Profesional de Honduras players
TT Pro League players
Maltese Premier League players
Saint Kitts and Nevis international footballers